The John Deere 435 is a tractor that was built for two years, 1959 and 1960.  Prior to 1960, John Deere only produced tractors that had two-cylinder engines.  The John Deere 435 was the only model that had a General Motors two-cylinder two-cycle engine, in the manner similar to their heavy truck engines of that era.  This engine and the two cycle truck engines were all equipped with a positive displacement supercharger.  There were a total of 4,626 John Deere 435 units built.

The John Deere 435 had some options that it could come with.  The front axle of the tractor had a sway-back front end for some of the models.  After 1960, the option was given to have power steering rather than mechanical steering.

See also
List of John Deere tractors

References

John Deere vehicles
Tractors